Nigel Stephen Mallatratt (15 June 1947, Mill Hill, London – 22 November 2004) was an English playwright, television screenwriter and actor.  He is best known for his television work on the ITV series Coronation Street, The Forsyte Saga (2002) and Island at War (2004), and for his stage adaptation of the novel The Woman in Black which has run in the West End since 1989. He was also an actor, appearing in minor roles in Chariots of Fire and Brideshead Revisited. Mallatratt was married three times, to Vanessa Mallatratt, Eileen O'Brien and stage manager Emma London. He had a daughter, Hannah, with O'Brien. He died of leukaemia in 2004.

Early life
Mallatratt originated from a lower-middle-class background. As a child, he was a pupil at Orange Hill Grammar School in Edgware where he excelled at drama, English, and swimming. He was feted for his performances in school plays. Among his various roles, he played Petruchio in  The Taming of the Shrew  with his manservant, Grumio, played by David Troughton. He was considered Oxbridge material but instead briefly entered the building trade, prior to becoming involved in acting.

Acting career
His love of acting was sparked in his teenage years when watching a performance at the Watford Palace Theatre. In 1968, he entered Central School of Speech and Drama, graduating in 1971. After his studies he joined the  Ipswich theatre, and later the Stephen Joseph Theatre, in Scarborough, at the invitation of actor and playwright Alan Ayckbourn. While in Scarborough, he appeared in  several productions, including Absent Friends, Bedroom Farce, The Breadwinners and The Brontes of Haworth, by Christopher Fry, in 1985.

Filmography

References

External links 
 

1947 births
2004 deaths
English male stage actors
English television writers
English soap opera writers
Deaths from leukemia
Deaths from cancer in England
English male film actors
English male television actors
English male dramatists and playwrights
20th-century English dramatists and playwrights
20th-century English male writers
British male television writers
20th-century English screenwriters